Blast of Silence is the third album by The Golden Palominos, released in 1986 by Celluloid Records.

Track listing

Personnel 
Musicians
Peter Blegvad – guitar, vocals on "Work Was New", vocals and acoustic guitar on "Strong, Simple Silences"
Carla Bley – piano on "Strong, Simple Silences"
Jack Bruce – vocals and bass guitar on "(Something Else Is) Working Harder"
T-Bone Burnett – guitar on "Work Was New", guitar and vocals on "Strong, Simple Silences"
Tony Conniff – bass guitar
Aïyb Dieng – percussion on "I've Been the One"
Don Dixon – vocals and guitar on "Faithless Heart"
Anton Fier – drums, percussion, additional production
Jody Harris – guitar
Lisa Herman – piano on "I've Been the One" and "Brides of Jesus"
Robert Kidney – vocals and guitar on "The Push and the Shove"
Bill Laswell – bass guitar
Nicky Skopelitis – guitar on "Something Becomes Nothing" and "(Something Else Is) Working Harder"
Sneaky Pete Kleinow – steel guitar on "I've Been the One" and "Faithless Heart"
Larry Saltzman – acoustic guitar on "(Something Else Is) Working Harder"
Chris Stamey – bass guitar on "I've Been the One" and "Brides of Jesus"
Syd Straw – vocals
Matthew Sweet – vocals on "Something Becomes Nothing"
Pat Thrall – acoustic guitar on "Strong, Simple Silences"
Bernie Worrell – Hammond organ
Production
Larry Hirsch – recording
Don Hünerberg – recording
Mike Krowiak – engineering, recording
Jeff Lippay – recording

References

External links 
 

1986 albums
Celluloid Records albums
The Golden Palominos albums
Albums produced by Anton Fier